Allochroa is a genus of gastropods belonging to the family Ellobiidae.

The species of this genus are found in Australia, Malesia, Pacific Ocean.

Species:

Allochroa affinis 
Allochroa bronnii 
Allochroa forestieri 
Allochroa layardi 
Allochroa nana 
Allochroa succinea 
Allochroa tenuis

References

Ellobiidae